Kramgoa låtar 6 is a 1978 Vikingarna studio album. It was also the band's final album with Stefan Borsch as the its singer. The album was rereleased to cassette tape in 1979 and to CD in 1996.

Track listing

Side 1
Export
Marie, Marie
Låt inte din skugga falla här
Hey Paula
Singin' in the Rain
Kommer du till lunden
Om du går nu (It's a Heartache)

Side 2
Du har gjort min gråa värld till guld igen (When My Blue Moon Turns to Gold Again)
En blyg liten tös
Det är ingen idé
Längtan efter dig
Hon får som hon vill (For a Few Dollars More)
Sail Along Silvery Moon
Corrine, Corrina
Godnattvalsen

Charts

References 

1978 albums
Vikingarna (band) albums
Swedish-language albums